Lincoln, also known as Gore Vidal's Lincoln, is a 1988 American television miniseries starring Sam Waterston as Abraham Lincoln, Mary Tyler Moore as Mary Todd Lincoln, and Richard Mulligan as William H. Seward.  It was directed by Lamont Johnson and was based on the 1984 novel of the same name by Gore Vidal.  It covers the period from Lincoln's election as President of the United States to the time of his assassination.  (It can also be noted that Waterston would later dub the voice of Lincoln in Ken Burns's documentary The Civil War the following year.)

Lamont Johnson won an Emmy for directing Lincoln.
The miniseries was also nominated for Outstanding Hairstyling for a Miniseries or a Special, Outstanding Art Direction in a Miniseries or a Special, Outstanding Costume Design for a Miniseries or a Special, Outstanding Lead Actress in a Miniseries or a Special (Mary Tyler Moore), Outstanding Directing in a Miniseries or a Special, Outstanding Mini-series and Outstanding Supporting Actress in a Miniseries or a Special (Ruby Dee) at the 40th Primetime Emmy Awards.

The film was shot almost entirely in Richmond, Virginia, and it cost $8 million to produce.

Cast

 Sam Waterston as Abraham Lincoln
 Mary Tyler Moore as Mary Todd Lincoln
 Richard Mulligan as William H. Seward
 Deborah Adair as Kate Chase 	
 Gregory Cooke as Robert Lincoln
 Steven Culp as Johnny Hay
 Jeffrey DeMunn as William Herndon
 Jon DeVries as Edwin Stanton
 James Gammon as Ulysses S. Grant
 Thomas Gibson as William Sprague
 Ruby Dee as Elizabeth Keckley
 John Houseman as Winfield Scott

References

External links
Lincoln at the Internet Movie Database

1988 television films
1988 films
American television films
1980s American television miniseries
American biographical series
Depictions of Abraham Lincoln on film
Cultural depictions of Ulysses S. Grant
Films based on American novels
Films scored by Ernest Gold
Films based on works by Gore Vidal
Television series about the American Civil War
Films directed by Lamont Johnson
NBC network original films